Arndell Anglican College is an independent Anglican co-educational primary and secondary day school located in the Sydney suburb of Oakville, New South Wales, Australia. The college includes students from Prep to Year 12.

History 

Arndell Anglican College was named after Thomas Arndell, one of Hawkesbury's first settlers. The college was originally established on the Macquarie Retreat in 1990, with Craig Laffin as the first headmaster.

1990s 

 1993: The college is relocated to its present location at Oakville.
 1995: Peter Walker becomes headmaster; the student population grows to over 800 students.
 1996: The college becomes part of the Sydney Anglican Schools Corporation.

2000s 

 2003: Dr John M. Goddard becomes headmaster, improving the curriculum and undertaking a number of building projects.
 2009: Dr Gareth Leechman becomes headmaster.

2010s 

 2014: The college introduces a laptop programme, providing students with laptops and necessary software. Tablets are given to junior students.
 2015: The senior school is divided into two cohorts. Years 7 to 9 are deemed Junior Students, whereas years 10 to 12 are deemed Senior Students. 
 2015: The 25th anniversary of Arndell Anglican College is celebrated with one school day devoted to student activities, as well as other events throughout the year.
 2016: The college is ranked within the top 150 schools in NSW based on HSC results.
 2018: Headmaster Gareth Leechman signs a petition with the Anglican Church Diocese of Sydney to retain s 38(3) in the Sex Discrimination Act 1984 (Cth).
2019: Connor McLeod, a student at the college, speaks at TEDxSydney, reflecting upon his successful 2016 campaign to print tactile banknotes for visually impaired people.

2020s 

 2020: The college is again ranked within the top 150 schools in NSW based on HSC results.

Headmasters 

The following individuals have served as headmaster of Arndell Anglican College:

Craig Laffin oversaw the establishment of the college at Cattai and its subsequent move to its current site at Oakville. He built the school community and educational ethos that influences the philosophy and daily life of the college.

Peter Walker saw the student population grow to over 800. He also transitioned the college into the Sydney Anglican Schools Corporation. The building infrastructure and financial security of the college was established during this time.

Dr Goddard built up the curriculum, especially in the faculty of music, and oversaw a significant number of building projects.

The current headmaster is Dr Gareth D Leechman. Leechman previously served as the headmaster at Clarence Valley Anglican School in Grafton, and has also been the Head of History and Head of House at Sydney Church of England Grammar School (Shore). In 2018, he signed a formal petition to retain s 38(3) in the Sex Discrimination Act 1984 (Cth).

Curriculum 
The following studies were available to senior students in 2019: 
English
Mathematics
Science
Technologies (including agriculture, IT processes, textiles and design, and software design and development, engineering)
Social Sciences
 History
Creative Arts
Personal Development, Health and Physical Education (PDHPE)
Languages
Vocational Education Training (VET)
Mandatory Biblical Studies
The college also offers a Gifted and Talented and Inclusive Learning programs.

College Ethos 
Arndell Anglican College is a Christian school that advocates religion strongly. Once a week, students attend chapel sermons discussing faith, the afterlife, and Jesus. The Arndell Way of Life stresses Christian morals and themes of unity, companionship, and acceptance. Similar understandings of life are taught in Biblical Studies, a class all students attend regardless of religious denomination or faith.

The college also aids many charities, such as the 40 Hour Famine for WorldVision.

The college's actions reflect its political conservatism and religious traditionalism views. It has advocated for strengthening religious freedoms.

Culture 
The crest builds on the legacy of the college. It is dominated by a central cross, indicating focus on Christ and his teachings. The rays signify an infusion of Christian thought, and the undulating lines represent the Hawkesbury River. The school colours of red and blue are distinctive among local schools.

Campus
The campus houses the following named buildings.

 Greenway House was named in honour of the convict architect Francis Greenway. This building's theme colour is green, and its verse is Philippians 4:13: “I can do all this through him who gives me strength.” The Geenway house mascot is a horse.

 Johnson House was named in honour of Richard Johnson, the first cleric of New South Wales. This structure's colour is blue, and its theme verse comes from Isaiah 40:31: “But those who hope in the Lord will renew their strength. They will soar on wings like eagles; they will run and not grow weary, they will walk and not be faint.” The Johnson House mascot is a eagle.

 Macquarie House has a theme colour of gold. It was named in honour of Lachlan Macquarie, the fifth governor of New South Wales. Its theme verse comes from Joshua 1:9: “Be strong and courageous. Do not be afraid; do not be discouraged, for the Lord your God will be with you wherever you go." The Macquarie house mascot is a lion.

 Tebbutt House, whose verse comes from 2 Timothy 4:7: “I have fought the good fight, I have finished the race, I have kept the faith,” was named in honour of John Tebbutt. The Tebbutt building's theme colour is red. The Tebbutt house mascot is a bull.
 Cartwright House is named in honour of Reverend Robert Cartwright (clergyman), who was appointed as a minister to the Hawkesbury in 1810 and began the building of St Mathews Anglican Church in Windsor.  Cartwright's colour is teal and its verse comes from 2 Timothy 1:7: "For the Spirit God gave us does not make us timid, but gives us power, love and self-discipline. The Cartwright house mascot is a python. 
 Lock House is named in honour of Maria Lock, land owner and daughter of Yarramundi, "Chief of the Richmond Tribes', the family belonged to the Boorooberongal clan of the Dharug people, and at 14 won first prize in the anniversary school examination, ahead of twenty children from the Native Institution and almost 100 European students.  Lock's colour is orange and its verse comes from Ephesians 5:1-2: "Follow God's example, therefore, as dearly loved children and walk in the way of love, just as Christ loved us and gave himself up for us as a fragrant offering and sacrifice to God." The Lock buildings's theme colour is orange. The Lock house mascot is a wombat. 

Located in Oakville, New South Wales, the Junior School and Senior School are on the same campus.

Most of the classrooms and/or buildings contain SMART Boards. The current facilities of the junior and senior campus include:

Two administration buildings
Four blocks of classrooms in the Junior School
Six blocks of classrooms in the Senior School
The Stubbs Junior Library, including a reading pit, printer and photocopier.
Two basketball courts
A gymnasium
The Mears Senior Library, including two printer/photocopiers and a mezzanine study area
A TAS Building with
a food technology kitchen
commercial kitchen
two textiles classrooms
strategic learning support office
one IT classroom
one multi-use classroom
Three art classrooms equipped with SMART Boards
Five science lab classrooms equipped with SMART Boards
Two canteens
The John Lambert Performing Arts Building, with
an auditorium that seats 550 people
two music practice classrooms
a dance and drama practice classroom
A sporting field in the Junior School
Two sporting fields and two cricket nets in the Senior School

 The Goddard block with
 6 classrooms
 4 locker slots
 purpose for English
 The Whelan block with
 5 classrooms
 4 locker slots
 purpose for Mathematics
 The Laffin block with
 5 classrooms
 purpose for Geography, History and Biblical Studies

Governance 
Arndell Anglican College is governed by a school council, which helps develop the college's facilities and growth. The current chairman of the council is Brenda King.

The school is part of the Sydney Anglican Schools Corporation and is affiliated with the Anglican Church Diocese of Sydney.

HSC results 

To the left is Arndell's HSC ranking according to BetterEducation.com.au, compared to all other schools sitting the HSC. The year 2016 was Arndell's best, with a ranking of 143 making it into the top 150 schools.

References

External links
 Arndell Anglican College official website
 Sydney Anglican Schools Corporation website

Anglican secondary schools in Sydney
Anglican primary schools in Sydney
1990 establishments in Australia
Educational institutions established in 1990